The Journal of Adolescence is a peer-reviewed scientific journal of primary research on adolescence. It was established in 1978 and is published by Wiley. The editor-in-chief is Nancy Darling (Oberlin College). It is unique among developmental journals in that it is owned by a British charity that funds courses, conferences, and training for professionals working directly with youth (FPSA). FPSA is funded solely by the journal.  According to Clarivate Analytics, the journal has a 2020 impact factor of 3.256. JoA is an interdisciplinary social science journal and international in scope.  It is explicitly developmental, covering age-related change or age-specific phenomenon in individuals 10–25.

References

External links

Elsevier academic journals
Pediatrics journals
Publications established in 1978
Bimonthly journals
Adolescence journals